KLAV (1230 AM) is a commercial radio station located in Las Vegas, Nevada. Owned by Lotus Communications, the station airs a betting-focused all-sports radio format featuring programming from the locally-based Vegas Stats & Information Network and programming from SportsMap. Its studios are located in the unincorporated community of Spring Valley in Clark County and its transmitter is located in North Las Vegas.

History

KLAV ran a middle-of-the-road (MOR) format until the late 1970s. In early 1979, at the peak of the disco craze, the station endeared itself "Disco 1-2-3 KLAV". KLAV evolved into a Top 40 format in the early 1980 under then program director Ted Ziegenbusch. It played a lot of R&B/Urban music that key rival Top 40 station, 98.5 KLUC, would not play at the time. KLAV was the first commercial station to play rap/hip-hop music in Las Vegas. In 1985 the station briefly switched to an easy-listening format and changed its call letters to KEZD but returned to its traditional KLAV name and time-brokered format by 1987.

KLAV previously broadcast from atop the former Bob Stupak's Vegas World Hotel & Casino until its closure in 2000. The station broadcast in a few locations around the Las Vegas Valley but eventually settled down at its current West Sahara Avenue location.

In August 2012, KLAV was sold by Hemisphere Broadcasting to Lotus Broadcasting. In April 2015, KLAV flipped to a Regional Mexican format as La Caliente.

In April 2017, while announcing that it had acquired the radio rights to the Vegas Golden Knights, Lotus announced that KLAV's FM transmitter K255CT would switch to a simulcast of KRLV.

In 2019, KLAV relaunched as "La Ranchera 1020 AM", emphasizing ranchero music. In August 2020, the station switched to all sports betting when the former programming and branding from KBAD/KRLV was moved to the station. KLAV subsequently relaunched as 1230 The Game. Later that month it was announced that KLAV would be the flagship station for the Henderson Silver Knights of the American Hockey League.

References

External links

FCC History Cards for KLAV

LAV
Radio stations established in 1948
1948 establishments in Nevada
Lotus Communications stations
Sports radio stations in the United States